William Mitchell (born August 2, 1959) is a Canadian football player who played professionally for the Ottawa Rough Riders, Toronto Argonauts, Montreal Alouettes and Edmonton Eskimos.

References

1959 births
Living people
Toronto Argonauts players
Ottawa Rough Riders players
Montreal Alouettes players
Edmonton Elks players
Players of Canadian football from Los Angeles
Long Beach State 49ers football players